Belk is an American department store chain.
Belk may also refer to:

People
 Belk (surname)

Places

Settlements
 Belk, Alabama
 Belk, Tennessee

Other places
 Belk Arena, arena on the campus of Davidson College
 Belk Freeway, alternate name for Interstate 277 in North Carolina
 Belk Gymnasium, gymnasium on the campus of the University of North Carolina at Charlotte
 Belk Hudson Lofts, apartment building in Huntsville, Alabama
 Belk Library (Elon University), library for Elon students, faculty, and staff
 Belk Theater, venue in the North Carolina Blumenthal Performing Arts Center

See also
Bełk (disambiguation)